Yermonino is a rural locality (a village) in Tolpukhovskoye Rural Settlement, Sobinsky District, Vladimir Oblast, Russia. The population was 236 as of 2010. There are 4 streets.

Geography 
Yermonino is located 21 km north of Sobinka (the district's administrative centre) by road. Nikulino is the nearest rural locality.

References 

Rural localities in Sobinsky District